Cinkassé is a town in Togo on the borders with Burkina Faso and Ghana. It lies about 38 km from Dapaong, and just over the border from the town of Cinkansé, Burkina Faso.

Transport
It is proposed to be the location of a dry port, particularly as it will be connected with the port of Lomé by an extended railway. The current railway finishes at Blitta.

See also
Railway stations in Togo

References

Populated places in Savanes Region, Togo